Interstate 285 (I-285) is an auxiliary Interstate Highway encircling Atlanta, Georgia, for . It connects the three major Interstate Highways to Atlanta: I-20, I-75, and I-85. Colloquially referred to as the Perimeter, it also carries unsigned State Route 407 (SR 407) and is signed as Atlanta Bypass on I-20, I-75, and I-85.

Because of suburban sprawl, it is estimated that more than two million people use the highway each day, making it the one of the busiest Interstates in the Atlanta metropolitan area, and one of the most heavily traveled roadways in the US. During rush hour, portions of the highway slow, sometimes to a crawl.

Route description

I-285 is 8 to 12 lanes wide, with the northern part from I-75 to SR 400 to I-85 the most heavily traveled. One segment of the highway near Tom Moreland Interchange (a large, flyover highway interchange northeast of Atlanta colloquially called Spaghetti Junction) with I-85 widens to 18 lanes, including collector–distributor lanes. Exits are numbered clockwise, starting at the southwesternmost point at I-85 and ending just east of there where it meets I-85 again near Hartsfield–Jackson Atlanta International Airport.

Between I-85 and I-20 in southwest Fulton County, I-285 is designated as the Bob A. Holmes Freeway (named after the member of the Georgia House of Representative), where I-285 heads north, and has an interchange with the Langford Parkway. Between I-20 in northwest Atlanta and I-75 near Cumberland Mall, it is designated as the James E. 'Billy' McKinney Highway (named after the member of the Georgia House of Representatives) as it continues north and starts to curve to the east just west of the I-75 interchange.

The northern portion of I-285, east of the Cobb Cloverleaf (I-75 interchange) to Spaghetti Junction (I-85 interchange), is frequently referred to as the Top End Perimeter. This section, which includes an interchange with SR 400 at exit 27 (frequently cited as the most dangerous intersections in Atlanta), is one of the busiest freeways in the US, handling about 250,000 cars per day and crossing through Cobb, Fulton, and DeKalb counties, with several interchanges (SR 141, SR 13, and I-85) bringing additional traffic to and from Gwinnett County. Through that stretch, the freeway expands from six or eight lanes to between 10 and 14 lanes.

While I-285 does not travel through Gwinnett County, the highway travels very close to the DeKalb–Gwinnett county line, and many major highways in Gwinnett County connect to I-285, with some prominent ones being US Route 78 (US 78), I-85, and SR 141. Major Gwinnett cities near I-285 are Peachtree Corners and Norcross.

From exit 25 to exit 27, I-285 is concurrent with US 19.

Much of Atlanta's high-end commercial real estate has developed along I-285, particularly at the northwestern I-75 and the SR 400 interchanges. Notable buildings include the 35-story Concourse at Landmark Center in the Perimeter Center business district and the Cobb Galleria complex in the Cumberland area.

East of Spaghetti Junction, I-285's direction switches from east to south, as it connects with the Stone Mountain Freeway at exit 39, and has an interchange with I-20 at exit 46, where I-285 starts to curve toward the southwest. At exit 52, it has an interchange with I-675 and heads straight west after the interchange with I-75 near the Hartsfield–Jackson Atlanta International Airport.

A portion of the section between I-75 and I-85 on the south side of I-285 has been bridged with a new runway and taxiway of Hartsfield–Jackson Atlanta International Airport, one of only two Interstates in the nation (along with I-564 in Norfolk, Virginia) to have an underpass beneath a runway (underpasses for taxiways do occur elsewhere). Computer animations were developed prior to construction to simulate a jumbo jet touching down on the runway from a driver's perspective. The entire highway within the tunnels is outfitted with stopped-vehicle sensors and fire detectors. Two electronic signs on either side of the tunnels can warn drivers if the tunnel is closed in an emergency. For  in the southwest corner, I-85 occupies the median of I-285, yet the roadways remain separate.

Heavy trucks traveling through (but not into) Atlanta are required to bypass the city on I-285, as there is a well-signed and heavily enforced ban on through truck traffic along I-75, I-85, I-20, SR 400, and many other major Atlanta thoroughfares. As with highways just outside I-285, trucks are also prohibited from the far-left one or two lanes (except where there are left exits open to trucks).

The complete circumference of I-285 is covered by Georgia Navigator, Georgia's intelligent transportation system (ITS). There have been 153 closed-circuit television traffic cameras, 26 electronic-message signs, and traffic-detection sensors installed in phases between 1999 and 2010 by the Georgia Department of Transportation (GDOT). Additionally, ramp meters are present at nearly all entrance ramps onto I-285, with the exception of the southeast section of I-285 and the major freeway-to-freeway connection ramps.

To many residents of Atlanta, the Perimeter defines a useful boundary to separate the Atlanta metropolitan area's core from its surrounding suburbs. People distinguish a location as being inside or outside the Perimeter, sometimes abbreviated as ITP and OTP, a recent local neologism. This was also the rough boundary chosen by BellSouth for separating landline telephone exchanges in suburban area code 770 from the existing area code 404 in 1995. Generally, 404 is Atlanta itself and most suburbs inside the Perimeter, while 770 serves most of the suburbs outside the Perimeter.

The entire length of I-285 is part of the National Highway System, a system of routes determined to be the most important for the nation's economy, mobility, and defense.

History

Early history

The route that became I-285 was first proposed by the Metropolitan Plan Commission, the predecessor agency to the Atlanta Regional Commission, in 1952, and added to the proposal that became the Interstate Highway System in 1955. At the time, much of the area through which the freeway now passes was still rural, but beginning to suburbanize, and the Interstate was initially intended to serve as a bypass of the city.

The first contract for I-285, a  section in DeKalb County that included part of the then-cloverleaf interchange with I-85, was awarded in June 1958. The  stretch between I-20 and East Ponce De Leon Avenue on the east side opened on August 24, 1968. The  section between I-20 on the east side and US 23 opened in early September 1968. The last stretch of the route opened on October 15, 1969, in a ceremony officiated by then-Governor Lester Maddox. Construction of the Interstate cost $90 million (equivalent to $ in ), and the entire route was initially two lanes in each direction for its entire length.

I-285 was widened to eight lanes in multiple phases as part of the Freeing the Freeways program at a cost of $355 million (equivalent to $ in ). The first stretch to be widened was the Top End section between Paces Ferry Road directly west of the interchange with I-75 and Chamblee Tucker Road, which began in July 1976 and was completed in August 1978. The section on the south end between US 19/41 and the eastern I-20 interchange was widened between June 1978 and November 1979. The section between the eastern I-20 interchange and Chamblee Tucker road was widened between August 1980 and December 1982. Work on widening the stretch on the west side between I-85 and Paces Ferry Road began in September 1981 and was completed in August 1983. The final widening project was completed in 1989 with the completion of the reconstruction of the concurrent section with I-85.

Interchange modification projects
Since its construction, most of the system-to-system interchanges on I-285 have been modified from their original configurations. Most of these were rebuilt or expanded during the Freeing the Freeways program.

The cloverleaf interchange with I-85 in DeKalb County, which had earned the nickname "Malfunction Junction", was reconstructed into the present Tom Moreland Interchange configuration, commonly known as "Spaghetti Junction", between January 10, 1983, and July 9, 1987.

The Emory Parrish Interchange, commonly known as the Cobb Cloverleaf, has been modified on multiple occasions. The first project, which took place in the late 1970s, constructed new mainline carriageways for I-285 traffic through the interchange, eliminating lefthand exits, and repurposed the original lanes into adjacent collector–distributor ramps. The next project, which took place in the mid-1980s, constructed a new flyover ramp between I-75 southbound and I-285 eastbound, and modified the connections between the interchange and the I-75 interchange to the north with Windy Hill Road with the addition of several new collector–distributor lanes and slip ramps to eliminate weaving. The original loop ramp that the flyover replaced, however, was left in place and remains in operation in the present day. The next modification occurred between 1996 and 1999 with the construction of the Cumberland Boulevard interchange on I-75 to the south. As part of this project, new collector–distributor ramps were constructed along I-75 between the Cobb Cloverleaf and the new interchange. In addition, the grading for a new flyover ramp from I-75 north to I-285 west to replace the existing loop ramp was constructed; however, no such ramp was ever constructed. The most recent modification, which took place between 2014 and 2018, added new access points to I-285 within the interchange for the Northwest Corridor Express Lanes.

The approximately  stretch of I-285 that runs concurrent with I-85 was heavily modified in multiple projects between the early and late 1980s that included the construction of separate adjacent carriageways for I-85 and I-285 in an effort to eliminate weaving and the addition of several collector–distributor ramps serving other roads.

Recent history
Until 2000, the state of Georgia used the sequential interchange numbering system on all of its Interstate Highways. The first exit on each highway began with the number "1" and increase numerically with each exit. In 2000, GDOT switched to a mileage-based exit system, in which the exit number corresponded to the nearest milepost.

This is intended to keep traffic moving at a reduced but steady speed, rather than suddenly braking drivers causing traffic to "clot" simply because other drivers are also braking (which causes unnecessary stop-and-go traffic).

In 2013, there were 26 fatal accidents on I-285, giving it the highest rate of such accidents per  of any Interstate in the country.

Future
Since the 1970s, GDOT has planned an outer loop, which would be a roughly  circumferential loop around the Atlanta metropolitan area. Under Governor Sonny Perdue, the plans were dropped from the Regional Transportation Plan, in favor of the expansion of the rural state road network outside of Atlanta. The state will instead widen portions of SR 20 north of the Atlanta metropolitan area, along a similar alignment to the Northern Arc.

GDOT broke ground in November 2017 on major improvements to the I-285/SR 400 interchange. The project includes collector–distributor roads along I-285 and SR 400, the addition of a diverging diamond interchange at SR 400 and Abernathy Road, and new flyover ramps. The project has total costs of $800 million and construction is expected to be complete in late 2020.

In January 2016, Governor Nathan Deal announced the major mobility investment program (MMIP), a collection of megaprojects planned around the state. The program includes the addition of express lanes on I-285 from I-20 (exit 10) across the north end of Atlanta to I-20 (exit 46). The program also includes reconstructing the interchanges with I-20.

The MMIP will construct two express lanes in each direction between Paces Ferry Road (mile 19) and Henderson Road (mile 35). This segment includes the addition of express lanes through major interchanges with I-75, SR 400, and I-85. Other projects will construct one express lane in each direction between I-20 (exit 10) and Paces Ferry Road, and from Henderson Road to I-20 (exit 46). The completion of all express lanes is planned in 2032.

On July 31, 2012, metro-area voters rejected the T-special-purpose local-option sales tax comprehensive transportation plan that was to be funded by an additional one-percent sales tax over a 10-year period. Among the projects included in the plan was a new exit on I-285 at Greenbriar Parkway on the southwest side of Atlanta (between present exits 2 and 5), as well as major reconstruction of interchanges at exits 27 (US 19/SR 400), 10 (I-20 west of Atlanta), and 33 (I-85 northeast of Atlanta).

Exit list
The following exits are listed clockwise from the southwest: going south to north, west to east, north to south, and east to west. An exception is that heading counterclockwise, exit 33 comes before exit 34.

In popular culture
Atlanta Braves pitcher Pascual Pérez became widely associated with I-285 after he got lost on it while trying to drive to a game. On August 19, 1982, Pérez, who had just received his first US driver's license, decided to drive himself to Atlanta–Fulton County Stadium (where the Braves played their home games at the time), where he was scheduled to start that evening's game against the Montreal Expos. He was unable to find the proper exit and circled the city several times before running out of gas and calling for help. When Pérez failed to arrive at the stadium by game time, the Braves called upon veteran pitcher Phil Niekro to make the emergency start. The Braves, who had been mired in a 2–19 slump, won the game, kicking off a 13–2 winning streak that carried the team to the National League West division title. The team subsequently made for Pérez a warmup jacket with the notation "I-285" in place of his uniform number. The humor of the incident was credited for helping to improve the morale of the team and breaking the losing streak.

See also

References

External links

 Interstate 285 (history and facts)
 Revive 285 top end (corridor project)

85-2
1963 establishments in Georgia (U.S. state)
85-2
285
2
Transportation in Fulton County, Georgia
Transportation in Cobb County, Georgia
Transportation in DeKalb County, Georgia
Transportation in Clayton County, Georgia